101st Division refers to the 101st Airborne Division of the United States.

101st Division may also refer to:

Infantry
 101st Infantry Division (France)
 101st Infantry Division (German Empire)
 101st Infantry Division (Syrian rebel group)
 101st Jäger Division (Wehrmacht) – German, World War II
 101st Motorised Division Trieste – Italian, World War II
 101st Rifle Division (Soviet Union)

See also
 101st Brigade (disambiguation)
 101st Regiment (disambiguation)
 101st Battalion (disambiguation)
 101 Squadron (disambiguation)

sl:Seznam divizij po zaporednih številkah (100. - 149.)#101. divizija